Shaarei Tzedec Congregation (also known as the Markham Street Shul) is an Orthodox Jewish synagogue located at 397 Markham Street in Toronto, Ontario, Canada.

The Shaarei Tzedec congregation was founded in 1902 and is the westernmost of the three Orthodox synagogues left in Downtown Toronto. In 1912, a number of families left Shaarei Tzedec, then on Centre Street, in a dispute over burial rites, and formed a new congregation, Chevra Rodfei Sholem, commonly known as the Kiever Shul.

Shaarei Tzedec has been located in a converted Victorian semi-detached house on Markham Street, near Bathurst Street and College Street, since 1937. The Markham Street Shul is one of the few remaining synagogues and the last remaining shtiebel of what were once dozens of small congregations in the area around Kensington Market, Spadina Avenue and Bathurst Street - which was a vibrant Jewish area prior to World War II.

References

External links
Congregation Shaarei Tzedec

Synagogues completed in 1937
Ashkenazi Jewish culture in Toronto
Ashkenazi synagogues
Orthodox synagogues in Canada
Jewish organizations established in 1902
Synagogues in Toronto
20th-century religious buildings and structures in Canada